John Serson (died 1744) was an English  sea captain best known for his invention of a "whirling speculum". This was an early form of artificial horizon designed for marine navigation, consisting of a mirror, attached to a spinning top, that attempted to remain in a horizontal plane despite the movement of the ship.  This device can be seen as a precursor to the gyroscope used in modern inertial navigation, although it was not itself a gyroscope.

See also
 Artificial horizon

References 

English inventors
1744 deaths
Year of birth unknown